Homoeocerus is a genus of leaf-footed bug in the family Coreidae. There are more than 120 described species in Homoeocerus, found in south and east Asia, and Sub-Saharan Africa.

See also
 List of Homoeocerus species

References

Further reading

External links

 

Coreinae
Coreidae genera